The "tonsil riots" of 1906 (also known as the Tonsillectomy Riots) were public health panics that took place on June 27, 1906, in New York City, concentrated in neighborhoods dominated by Jewish immigrants, that centered on the actions of Board of Health physicians who performed tonsillectomies and adenoidectomies on students at several public schools. The rioters were mostly Jewish mothers who were disturbed by the sight of their children returning home from school displaying symptoms from the surgeries.

In the course of the riot, groups of Jewish women verbally and physically altercated with school principals, police, and anyone who bore the resemblance of a Board of Health official.

References 

Jews and Judaism in New York City
1906 in New York (state)
1906 riots
New York City Department of Health and Mental Hygiene
Tonsil